A Touch Of Someone Else's Class is the second studio album, under the Alive Records label, by the Nashville, TN rock band, Black Diamond Heavies.  Dan Auerbach of The Black Keys produced this album while it was recorded at his Akron Analog Studio. Also, for the song "Bidin’ My Time", Black Diamond Heavies were joined by Black Keys drummer, Patrick Carney.

Track listing

References

2008 albums
Black Diamond Heavies albums
Alive Naturalsound Records albums
Albums produced by Dan Auerbach